General Anaya was one of the original 13 delegaciones (boroughs) of the Mexican Federal District, named after Pedro María de Anaya. In 1941 it was merged with the Central Department to form Mexico City.

Boroughs of Mexico City